Euphorbia bulbispina  is a spiny plant of the family Euphorbiaceae. It was described by Rauh & Razafindratsira in Euphorbia Journal 7: 31. 1991. It is endemic to a very small area in northern Madagascar where it is found in rock cracks in the Antsiranana district.

It has been assessed as vulnerable on the IUCN Red List.

Footnotes

References 
Rauh, W. (1991), New and little known euphorbias from Madagascar, Euphorbia Journal, 7: 21–35
Rauh, W. (1992), Succulent Euphorbias of northern Madagascar; Collectanea Botanica a Barcinonensi Botanico Instituto Edita, 21: 197–210
Rauh, W. (1995). Succulent and Xerophytic plants of Madagascar. Vol I. Strawberry Press, Mill Valley.
Russo, L (2001).: Euphorbia bulbispina Rauh & Razafindratsira, a fascinating species from Madagascar; Cactus & Co, 4(5): 229–230

bulbispina
Vulnerable plants